Cricbuzz is an Indian cricket news website owned by Times Internet. It features, news, articles and live coverage of cricket matches including videos,  text commentary, player stats and team rankings. Their website also offers a mobile app.

Cricbuzz is one of the most popular mobile apps for cricket news and scores in India. The site was the seventh most searched for site in India in 2014. The mobile app has over 100 million downloads as of February 2022 and the website is used by more than 50 million users worldwide, generating 2.6 billion page views in Jan 2015.

History

Cricbuzz was created by Pankaj Chhaparwal, Piyush Agrawal, and Pravin Hegde in 2004. In 2010, Cricbuzz started developing a mobile app for live cricket news and scores.

In November 2014, Times Internet, a subsidiary of Times of India acquired a majority stake in Cricbuzz for an undisclosed sum. The website continues to be managed by the original founders.

In January 2015, Times Internet-owned GoCricket was merged into Cricbuzz. GoCricket's website was redirected to Cricbuzz and the GoCricket mobile app was also merged with that of Cricbuzz. Cricbuzz hired Harsha Bhogle as ‘Voice of Cricket’ in September 2016 and has produced over 150 videos with the esteemed commentator and cricket expert ever since.

In August 2015, Cricbuzz was named the title sponsor of the India-Sri Lanka test series.

Cricbuzz was reported to be the second most downloaded news app in the world for the second quarter of 2019.

See also
 ESPNcricinfo
 CricketArchive

References

External links
 (Mobile)

Cricket websites
Indian sport websites
Internet properties established in 2004
2004 establishments in India
Multilingual websites
The Times Group
Companies of The Times Group
Publications of The Times Group